Ramadas Panemangalore Shenoy was an Indian defence scientist and writer, known for his contributions in the field of Radar technology. He secured a doctoral degree in Electrical Engineering from the University of Wisconsin–Madison and joined Defence Research and Development Organization in 1961, involving himself with the indigenous development of Radar technology till his retirement, as a Distinguished Scientist, in 1989.

A fellow of the Indian National Academy of Engineering and a Distinguished Fellow of the Institution of Electronics and Telecommunication Engineers, Shenoy served as a visiting professor at the Indian Institute of Science, Bengaluru. He is credited with several publications and his book, Defence Research and Development Organisation, 1958-1982 details the history military research at the organization. He is a recipient of the IETE-IRSI Award and Aryabhatta Award. The Government of India awarded him the fourth highest civilian honour of Padma Shri in 1987.

Early life and education

Dr. R. P. Shenoy also known as Ramadas Panemangalore Shenoy was born to Mrs. P. Sanjivi Shenoy and Mr. Panemangalore Narasimha Shenoy in Mangalore, Karnataka, India on 28 April 1929.

Dr. R. P. Shenoy started his schooling at Canara High School, Mangalore, Karnataka, India and went to attend BSc Physics at Presidency College, University of Madras, Tamil Nadu, India. Thereafter, he moved to Banaras Hindu University, Varnasi, Uttar Pradesh, India for his Post Graduation in Physics. He completed his Post Graduate Diploma in Electrical Communication Engineering from the prestigious Indian Institute of Science (IISc), Bangalore, Karnataka, India before moving to the University of Wisconsin, USA for his PhD in Electrical Engineering.

Career

After completing his PhD in 1957, he worked for 3 years in TV and Broadcasting Division of Radio Corporation of America at Camden, New Jersey, USA and then returned to Bangalore, Karnataka, India in 1960.

With his leadership and managerial skills, he played several roles with Electronics and Radar Development Establishment (LRDE) from 1960 to 1987 including the role of Director from 1973 to 1987.

He worked as a Scientist in the following:

 Electronics and Radar Development Establishment (LRDE), Bangalore, Karnataka, India - a unit under the Defence Research and Development Organisation (DRDO), Ministry of Defence (1960-1967)
 Deputy Director, Defence Research & Development Laboratory (DLRL), Hyderabad, Andhra Pradesh, India - a unit under the Defence Research and Development Organisation (DRDO) (1967-1971)
 Deputed as Chief Technical Officer to Bharat Electronics Limited (BEL), Ghaziabad, Uttar Pradesh, India - for Development of New Generation Radars to the Indian Air Force (1971-1973)

He has contributed significantly to Radar Technology and was also part of some of the most successful projects during his tenure in LRDE.

Directorship on other Boards –

 NALTECH Pvt. Ltd, Bangalore, Karnataka, India: Director (1993-2006)
 ASM Technologies Limited, Bangalore, Karnataka, India : Director (1993-2002, 2006-2012)
 Astra Microwave Products Limited, Hyderabad, Andhra Pradesh, India : Chairman (1995-2009)
 Board of Director for Public Sector Units in India such as Bharat Electronics Limited (BEL), Hindustan Teleprinters Limited, Karnataka State Electronics Development Corporation Limited (KEONICS) and Electronics Corporation of Tamil Nadu (ELCOT)

Dr. R. P. Shenoy has been with the Indian Institute of Science, Bangalore, Karnataka, India, since 1990 as a Visiting Professor and with the Jawaharlal Nehru Center for Advanced Scientific Research, Bangalore, Karnataka, India, since 1993.

Death

Dr. R. P Shenoy died on 16 August 2012 at Bangalore.

Area of Expertise
His areas of expertise included, Electronics Engineering, microwave engineering, radar and communication technology, encryption and restricted access systems, with specific emphasis on defence applications and associated electronic warfare, microwave tubes.

Published works
 Advanced Radar Techniques & Systems
 IETE: The First Four Decades
 Defence Research and Development Organisation (1958-1982)

Awards and achievements 

 Padma Shri, 1987, one of the highest civilian awards in India
 VASVIK Research Award (1983) - Electrical and Electronic Sciences and Technology
 IETE-IRSI Award (1985) for Pioneering Radar Development in India
 Aryabhata Award (2000) for promoting Astronautics in India
 Distinguished Alumnus (2000) Indian Institute of Science, Bangalore
 DRDO Lifetime Achievement Award (2001)
 Vacuum Electronic Devices & Applications Society Lifetime Achievement Award (2006)
 Fellow of Indian National Academy of Engineering & Distinguished Fellow of IETE

Dr. R.P. Shenoy award for Excellence in Science
ASM Technologies Ltd. instituted the “Dr. R. P. Shenoy award for Excellence in Science” in memory of its former Director, Late Dr. R. P. Shenoy, a Distinguished Scientist of Defence Research & Development Organization (DRDO) of the Government of India. The award is extended to  8th and 9th grade students of Kendriya Vidyalaya, DRDO complex, Bangalore, who have secured A1 grade in Science.

Bibliography
 Advanced Radar Techniques & Systems
 IETE: The First Four Decades
 Defence Research and Development Organisation (1958-1982)

See also

 Radar
 Defence Research and Development Organisation

References

Recipients of the Padma Shri in science & engineering
Indian military engineers
University of Wisconsin–Madison College of Engineering alumni
Academic staff of the Indian Institute of Science
Indian technology writers
People associated with radar
20th-century Indian engineers
Scientists from Bangalore
1929 births
2012 deaths